The Soviet Union's 1949–1951 nuclear test series was a group of 3 nuclear tests conducted in 1949–1951. These tests preceded the 1953 Soviet nuclear tests series.

References

1949-1951
1949 in the Soviet Union
1951 in the Soviet Union
1949 in military history
1951 in military history
Explosions in 1949
Explosions in 1951